is a Japanese manga series written and illustrated by Okura. It started serialization on the Gangan Pixiv website in August 2019. As of December 2021, four volumes have been released.

Plot
The manga follows Tomoko Aoyama and her eldest son Hiroki. Hiroki is secretly gay but is embarrassed to reveal his sexuality, unaware that his own mother already knows it. While Tomoko has accepted her son and supports him, she refuses to out her son as she wants Hiroki himself to admit his sexuality by his own accord. Other supporting characters including Yuri, Tomoko's younger son and Hiroki's brother, who despite having no interest in romance, has attracted many girls attention and is also aware of his brother's sexuality, Akiyoshi, Tomoko's husband and the boys father, who is constantly travelling for work who love his sons but sometimes unintentionally hurts Hiroki's feelings due to his negative and outdated views on homosexuality, Daigo, Hiroki's classmate and his secret crush and Asumi, Hiroki's childhood friend who develops feelings for Hiroki but is unaware of his sexuality.

Publication
The series is written and illustrated by Okura. It started serialization on the Gangan Pixiv service on August 16, 2019. The first tankōbon volume was released on August 22, 2019. As of December 2021, four tankōbon volumes have been released.

In July 2020, Square Enix announced they would also be publishing the series in English.

Volume list

Reception
Ash Brown from Manga Bookshelf praised the first volume, calling it an "absolute delight". Danica Davidson from Otaku USA also praised the first volume, calling it "endearing". Lynzee Loveridge from Anime News Network rated the first volume an A, praising the characters, plot, and artwork. Sarah from Anime UK News also praised the first volume, stating it "delivers an entertaining and feel-good read". Like previous critics, Takato from Manga News also praised both the plot and artwork.

References

External links
 

2010s LGBT literature
Comedy anime and manga
Gangan Comics manga
Josei manga
LGBT in anime and manga
School life in anime and manga
Slice of life anime and manga